Traci Paige Johnson (born April 21, 1969) is an American animator and voice actress best known for creating the Nick Jr. television series, Blue's Clues (1996–2006), its spin-off, Blue's Room (2004–2007), and the reboot series, Blue's Clues & You! (2019–present). She voices the titular character for the original series and & You!.

Biography
While a student at Northwestern University, where she earned a degree in radio, television, and film, Johnson began developing her "unique signature style of cutout animation using construction paper and everyday objects and textures". She was a freelance animator in the early 1990s when cable television network Nickelodeon wanted to create a new television show for preschoolers. She already had experience working in children's television. In 1994, Johnson, along with producer Angela Santomero and director Todd Kessler, which Nickelodeon executive Brown Johnson called a "green creative team", created the series Blue's Clues. According to writer Diane Tracy, Johnson, Santomero, and Kessler did not possess traditional backgrounds of most producers of children's programs, but "did possess an amazing combination of talents, backgrounds, and personal attributes". Also, according to Tracy, Johnson would "change the look of preschool children's television". Johnson reported that she was cast as the voice of Blue, the show's main animated character because out of the show's crew, she sounded the most like a dog.

While in high school, she was a member of an award-winning student-produced comedy show, Beyond Our Control which ran on the local NBC affiliate, WNDU-TV, at that time owned and operated by the University of Notre Dame.

She is married to Robert Mowen (another Beyond Our Control alum) and has three sons: Thomas, Oliver, and Emmet.

Filmography

Notes

Works cited
 Tracy, Diane. (2002). Blue's Clues for Success: The 8 Secrets Behind a Phenomenal Business. New York: Kaplan Publishing. .

External links
 

1969 births
Living people
20th-century American actresses
21st-century American actresses
20th-century American women artists
21st-century American women artists
Place of birth missing (living people)
American animated film producers
American women television producers
American voice actresses
Nickelodeon people
Nickelodeon Animation Studio people
Northwestern University School of Communication alumni
American women animators